Sath Samudura (English language, "Seven Seas") is a landmark Sri Lankan film directed by professor Siri Gunasinghe and released in 1967. This film was critically acclaimed and is considered a major work in Sri Lankan cinema.

It depicts the plight of fishermen living in the Southern Province of Sri Lanka.

Cast 
 Cyril Wickramage as Gunadasa
 Denawaka Hamine as Karolina, Gunadasa's mother
 Edmund Wijesinghe as Sirisena
 Swarna Mallawarachchi as Soma
 Leena Fernando as Wimala
 Hemamali Gunasinghe as Sophie 'Nona'
 Rathnawali Kekunawela as Wimala's mother
 Somasiri Dehipitiya as Peter
 Bertie Kirthisena 
 Sumitra Rajasinghe
 Sirimathi Rasadari

Music
The score for the movie was composed and directed by Somadasa Elvitigala. Unlike popular films of the time, only a few songs were included and these were of sombre and austere quality. W. D. Amaradeva served as the vocalist.

Reception 
The film was a huge critical success within Sri Lanka.

At the 1968 Sarasaviya Film Awards, the film took home Best Film, Best Director, Best Male Film Role (Edmund Wijesinghe), Best Female Film Role (Denawaka Hamine), Best Film Editing, Best Music Direction, Best Lyricist (Mahagama Sekera - "Sinidu Sudu Mudu Thalawe") and Best Male Singer (W. D. Amaradeva - "Sinidu Sudu Mudu Thalawe").

In 1997, it was named one of the Top Ten films of the first 50 years of Sri Lankan cinema.

References

External links
 

1967 films
Films set in Sri Lanka (1948–present)